Shi Hairong (施海荣) (born 1977-03-27 in Nantong, Jiangsu) is a male Chinese volleyball player. He was part of the gold medal winning team at the 2001 National Games.

He competed for Team China at the 2008 Summer Olympics in Beijing.

References
Profile

1977 births
Living people
Chinese men's volleyball players
Olympic volleyball players of China
Sportspeople from Nantong
Volleyball players at the 2008 Summer Olympics
Volleyball players from Jiangsu